The 2012–13 season is Levski Sofia's 91st season in the First League. This article shows player statistics and all matches (official and friendly) that the club has played during the 2012–13 season.

Transfers

Summer transfers

In: 

Out:

See List of Bulgarian football transfers summer 2012

Winter transfers

In: 

Out:

See List of Bulgarian football transfers winter 2013

Squad

Statistics

Goalscorers

Cards

Pre-season and friendlies

Summer

Winter

Competitions

A Group

Table

Results summary

Results by round

Fixtures and results

Bulgarian Cup

Second round

Levski advanced to Third round.

Third round

Levski advanced to Quarterfinals.

Quarterfinals

Levski advanced to Semifinals.

Semifinals

Levski advanced to the Final.

Final

Europa League

Second qualifying round 

Levski is eliminated from the competition.

References

PFC Levski Sofia seasons
Levski Sofia